The men's 3000 metres event  at the 1980 European Athletics Indoor Championships was held on 2 March in Sindelfingen.

Results

References

3000 metres at the European Athletics Indoor Championships
3000